Jessica Anne Jerome (born February 8, 1987) is an American ski jumper who has been competing since 2000.  She started ski jumping at age of 7, and in 2001 became a Junior Olympic champion. She holds the honor of being a three-time national champion (with wins in 2002, 2003 and 2005). In 2006, she finished third in the Continental Cup, behind Anette Sagen and Lindsey Van.

On December 29, 2013, Jessica Jerome became the first U.S. woman to win the U.S. Olympic Trials in women’s ski jumping.  Her combined two jumps scored 248.5 points in her hometown of Park City, Utah.

References

External links
 FIS profile 

1987 births
American female ski jumpers
Living people
Olympic ski jumpers of the United States
Ski jumpers at the 2014 Winter Olympics
21st-century American women